XXV may refer to:

 25 (number)
 XXV (Klamydia album)
 XXV (Oomph! album)
 XXV (Robbie Williams album)
 XXV (The Shadows album)
 XXV (Vader album)
 XXV: The Essential, an album by Mike Oldfield